Viscount Wentworth was a title used by:

 Thomas Wentworth, 1st Earl of Strafford (1593–1641), English statesman and a major figure in the period leading up to the English Civil War
 Baron Wentworth
 Edward Noel, 1st Viscount Wentworth (1715–1774)
 Thomas Noel, 2nd Viscount Wentworth (1745–1815), British politician

Noble titles created in 1628
Noble titles created in 1711
Noble titles created in 1762